A statue of Bruce Lee was unveiled on 26 November 2005 in the city of Mostar, Bosnia and Herzegovina, by sculptor Ivan Fijolić.

History
The statue was the first public monument to Bruce Lee unveiled in the world, with a statue in Hong Kong being revealed one day later marking what would have been the Hong Kong American star's 65th birthday.

The project of the statue was spearheaded by Mostar Urban Movement, a youth group headed by Nino Raspudić and Veselin Gatalo, who saw the statue as "an attempt to question symbols, old and new, by mixing up high grandeur with mass culture and kung fu." In a city that had been torn in war by ethnic divisions, the dynamic movie star was a symbol of "loyalty, skill, friendship and justice." Lee was "far [enough] away from us that nobody can ask what he did during World War II" and "part of our idea of universal justice–that the good guys can win". Lee, although an American of Chinese descent and famous martial arts actor, represented at least one thing that could bridge the divides between Mostar residents: "One thing we all have in common is Bruce Lee."

The unveiling ceremony of the statue saw the attendance of local Bruce Lee fans, representatives of the German government, which had bankrolled the project, as well as Chinese officials. Martial arts is popular among the youth population in Herzegovina, especially competitive mixed martial arts where Croatian Mirko Filipović is an international star.

Shortly afterward the sculpture was vandalized, removed for repairs and brought back at the end of May 2013. Both Bosniaks and Croats had complained that the statue was a provocation because they thought it was pointed towards their side of the city in a fighting stance, so its creators rotated the statue to face a neutral direction.

See also

Statue of Bruce Lee (Hong Kong)
Statue of Bruce Lee (Los Angeles)

References

Bronze sculptures in Bosnia and Herzegovina
Memorials to Bruce Lee
Martial arts culture
Mostar
Sculptures of sports
Vandalized works of art
Portraits of actors